Ramakrishna Math is the administrative legal organization of the Ramakrishna Order, considered part of the Hindu reform movements. It was set up by sanyasin disciples of Ramakrishna Paramhansa headed by Swami Vivekananda at Baranagar Math in Baranagar, a place near Calcutta (now Kolkata), in 1886. India. The headquarters of Ramakrishna Math and its twin organisation, Ramakrishna Mission is at Belur Math (in West Bengal, India).

Although Ramakrishna Math and Ramakrishna Mission are legally and financially separate, they are closely inter-related in several other ways and are to be regarded as twin organizations. All branch centres of Ramakrishna Math come under the administrative control of the Board of Trustees, whereas all branch centres of Ramakrishna Mission come under the administrative control of the Governing Body of Ramakrishna Mission.

The Ramakrishna Math and the Ramakrishna Mission have 221 centers all over the world: 
167 in India, 
15 in Bangladesh, 
14 in the United States,
2 in Canada 
2 in Russia,
2 in South Africa,
and one each in Argentina, Australia, Brazil, Fiji, France, Germany, Ireland, Japan, Malaysia, Mauritius, Nepal, the Netherlands, Singapore, Sri Lanka, Switzerland, the United Kingdom, and Zambia. In addition, there are 45 sub-centres (22 within India, 23 outside India) under different centres.

Besides these branch centres, there are about one thousand unaffiliated centres (popularly called 'private centres') all over the world started by the devotees and followers of Sri Ramakrishna and Swami Vivekananda.

Monastic order

Ramakrishna Math consists of monks (Sannyasins and Brahmacharins) belonging to a monastic order for men. The Ramakrishna Order (Bengali: রামকৃষ্ণ সংঘ) is the monastic lineage that was founded by Ramakrishna, when he gave the ocher cloth of renunciation to twelve of his close disciples, in January 1886 at the Cossipore House. After the passing away of their Master Sri Ramakrishna in 1886 the young disciples under the leadership of Swami Vivekananda organized themselves into a new monastic order. The original monastery at Baranagar called Baranagar Math was shifted in January 1899 to a newly acquired plot of land at Belur in the district of Howrah.

Mother of the Order
Sri Sarada Devi, popularly called as Holy Mother and Sangha Janani (Mother of the Order), played a key role in the establishment of the Ramakrishna Order. During the early days, when the young monks were roaming about penniless, it was the Holy Mother who gave them encouragement, inspiration, and her prayers.

Genesis

Baranagar Math
During his lifetime, Ramakrishna gathered and trained his young disciples, with Narendranath (future Vivekananda) as their anointed leader. It is these disciples - some of whom were also blessed with monastic robes by Ramakrishna himself, that formed the core of a new monastic order that bears his name now. Swami Vivekananda and fifteen others were the founders of this order. After taking formal monastic vows through appropriate rituals (12 at first and the rest at different times later) they assumed new names as follows (based on seniority in age):
 
 Gopal - Swami Advaitananda (1828-1909)
 Taraknath - Swami Sivananda (1854-1934)
 Baburam - Swami Premananda (1861-1918)
 Yogindra - Swami Yogananda (1861-1899)
 Harinath - Swami Turiyananda (1863-1922)
 Narendranath - Swami Vivekananda (1863-1902)
 Rakhal - Swami Brahmananda (1863-1922)
 Sasibhusan - Swami Ramakrishnananda (1863-1911)
 Gangadhar - Swami Akhandananda (1864-1937)
 Kaliprasad - Swami Abhedananda (1866-1939)
 Saratchandra - Swami Saradananda (1865-1927)
 Saradaprasanna - Swami Trigunatitananda (1865-1914)
 Subodhachandra - Swami Subhodananda (1867-1932)
 Hariprasanna - Swami Vijnanananda (1868-1938)
 Latu - Swami Adbhutananda (died 1920)
 Nityaniranjan - Swami Niranjanananda (died 1904)

Alambazar Math
From February 1892 to February 1898, the Ramakrishna Math was located at Alambazar, half a mile from Dakshineshwar Temple. The house which housed the Alambazar Math, as it is popularly known today, was visited by Sri Ramakrishna.

Nilambar Mukherjee Garden
For a short period, the math was temporarily moved to the Nilambar Mukherjee Garden, below the final settlement at Belur Math.

Belur Math

This monastery, known as Belur Math, serves as the Mother House for all the monks of Ramakrishna Order who live in the various branch centres of Ramakrishna Math and/or the related Ramakrishna Mission in different parts of India and the world.

Motto and emblem

Any organisation, especially the one that bears the name of an epoch-making person, needs a motto to guide it and an emblem that constantly reminds and inspires. Realising this, Vivekananda placed before it the motto: आत्मनो मोक्षार्थम् जगद्धिताय च – Atmano Mokshartham jagaddhitaya cha ( 'For the liberation of the Self and service to the society'). He also designed a charming but distinctive emblem that effectively reflected this motto. It consists of an elegant swan against the backdrop of the rising sun, surrounded by wavy waters from which has arisen a beautiful lotus flower along with a couple of leaves. This whole picture is encircled by a hooded serpent.

Whereas the motto adds a social dimension to the hitherto, purely personal, aspect of a self-centred sadhana, the emblem – which graphically describes a balanced combination or harmony of all the four yogas – enriches that sadhana by making it more comprehensive.

Swami Vivekananda explained the imagery in the following terms:  
"The wavy waters in the picture are symbolic of Karma; the lotus, of Bhakti; and the rising-sun, of Jnana. The encircling serpent is indicative of Yoga and the awakened Kundalini Shakti, while the swan in the picture stands for Paramatman (Supreme Self). Therefore, the idea of the picture is that by the union of Karma, Jnana, Bhakti and Yoga, the vision of Paramatman is obtained."

Bifurcation 
The basic philosophy of life put before the Ramakrishna Order by Vivekananda automatically led to a bifurcation of its activities into two important, but parallel, areas. The atmamoksha aspect resulted in the establishment of the Ramakrishna Math, an organisation catering predominantly to the spiritual needs of the monks of the order as also its votaries. The jagaddhita aspect, on the other hand, gave rise to another, a sister organisation, concentrating solely on public service activities.

Characteristics 
Unlike the old monastic traditions prevalent at the time, the Ramakrishna movement has certain unique features. They may be listed as follows:

Non-sectarianism
The Ramakrishna movement does not identify itself with any particular sect or group or even tradition. It embraces the whole gamut of religio-spiritual development of the entire Hindu culture over the last five thousand years or more. It also has room for other religions and faiths. Therefore, Ramakrishna Math allows people even outside the Hindu faith to embrace monastic life following the basic monastic disciplines as exemplified in the lives of Ramakrishna-Vivekananda.

Group life and work ethic 
Since its cradle years, the Ramakrishna monks have chosen to live in a group. Though from time to time, the monks went into solitude or wandering alone, the sense of brotherhood among them was too strong to keep anyone away from the monastery for too long. Since Sri Ramakrishna himself insisted on Sadhu Sangha (holy company) it is but natural for his disciples to seek the company of the each other The greatest advantage of a Sangha (organisation of monks) is strengthening of one another's spiritual vibrations and the rounding off one's angularities.

The philosophy of service of this Sangha is serving the Jiva as Siva (God). Thus, what is usually a mere act of social service is elevated to a spiritual practice. "No work is secular" is a popular dictum in the Ramakrishna-Vivekananda circle. Moreover, its members practice the teachings of Karma Yoga of 'perfection in action', therefore, any work taken up has to be carried out with efficiency as a spiritual discipline.

The fact that the Movement lays great stress on selfless service as a means of God-realization also attracts many people. The service it gives is open to all, irrespective of caste or creed or language.

Ramakrishna's monks also are not averse to modern technologies, but on the other hand, actively canvass the use of technologies for the progress and well-being of the society.

Attitude toward social reform
Swami Vivekananda urged for a 'root and branch reform' and not merely superficial progress or development. Real reformation starts with reforming and refining one's own character. Character building and personality development are some of the activities taken up by the Ramakrishna centres to bring real lasting changes in the society. Therefore, the Ramakrishna Order do not directly involve itself in any social reformation.

Attitude toward politics
Swami Vivekananda with an uncanny vision of the future forbade his organization strictly from taking part in any political movement or activity. Why? Because the monk is a world-citizen, nay, a man of God! (And, world-citizens do not dabble in politics, whereas Godmen have no politics at all.)

Administration
The Ramakrishna Math was registered as a Trust in 1901. The management of the Math is vested in a Board of Trustees, who are only monks. The Math with its branches is a distinct legal entity. It has well-defined rules of procedure. It lays emphasis on religious practices and preaching of Dharma. The Math has its own separate funds and keeps detailed accounts which are annually audited by qualified chartered accountants.

In consultation with the senior monks of the Order, the Trustees elect from among themselves a President, one of three Vice Presidents, a General Secretary and four Assistant Secretaries. The President, also called the 'Sanghaguru' is the supreme Head of the whole organisation and the sole authority to confer Samnyasa or administering the monastic vow. The Presidents, Vice Presidents (or the Head of a foreign centre) are also empowered to give initiation or Mantra Diksha to devotees aspiring for it.

The General Secretary is the administrative head of the organisation. However, his power is limited to implementing the decisions taken by the Trustees/Members of the Governing Body, though he has the freedom to act in matters of day-to-day administration. The Assistant Secretaries work under his guidance.

The individual centres of the Math are managed by the Adhyaksha and of the Mission, by the secretaries, duly appointed by the Trustees/Members of the Governing Body. These again, are expected to carry on their work with the assistance of the monastic members allotted to their centres as also volunteers and paid-workers.

As of 31 March 2014, there were 409 monastic members, 254 lay members, and 181 lay associates.

Vedanta

The fundamental truth as taught by all religions is that man has to transform his base human nature into the divine that is within him. In other words, he must reach the deeper strata of his being, wherein lies his unity with all mankind. And Vedanta can help us to contact and live that truth which unfolds our real nature — the divinity lying hidden in man. 

Vedanta is not a particular religion, but a philosophy which includes the basic truths of all religions. It teaches that man's real nature is divine; that it is the aim of man's life on earth to unfold and manifest the hidden Godhead within him; and that truth is universal. 

Thus, Vedanta preaches a universal message, the message of harmony. In its insistence on personal experience of the truth of God, on the divinity of man, and the universality of truth, it has kept the spirit of religion alive since the age of the Vedas (ancient scriptures). Even in our time there have been Ramakrishna, Vivekananda, and men like Gandhi. The modern apostle of Vedanta, Vivekananda, describes the ideal religion of tomorrow as follows:

Further reading
 Harshananda, Swami, "A Concise Encyclopedia of Hinduism", Ramakrishna Math, Bangalore (2008). Vol.3, 
 Gahanananda, Swami, "Ramakrishna Mission for All", Sri Ramakrishna Math, Chennai, 
 Prabhananda, Swami, "The Ramakrishna Movement," The Ramakrishna Mission Institute of Culture, Calcutta, (1991), 
 Budhananda, Swami, "The Ramakrishna Movement: Its Meaning for Mankind," Advaita Ashrama, Kolkata (1980), 
 Prabhananda, Swami, "The Early History of the Ramakrishna Movement," Sri Ramakrishna Math, Chennai (2005), 
 Shraddhananda, Swami, "The Story of An Epoch," Sri Ramakrishna Math, Chennai, (1980), 
 "Monasticism: Ideals and Traditions," Sri Ramakrishna Math, Chennai (1991) 
 Report of Governing Body for 2013-2014

See also
Ramakrishna Sarada Math
Baranagar Ramakrishna Mission

References

External links

Official Website

Hindu organisations based in India
Hindu monasteries in India
Hindu religious orders
Hindu new religious movements
Organisations based in Howrah
Ramakrishna Mission
Swami Vivekananda